The Eastern Professional Hockey League (1914–15) was an ice hockey league that was formed from the remainder of the Maritime Professional Hockey League (1912-1914) teams. It consisted of a three team league that operated for a part of the 1914-15 season. The New Glasgow Black Foxes and Sydney Millionaires from the MaPHL were joined by the new Glace Bay Miners. The Black Foxes folded on January 7, 1915 and the league folded on February 7 with an incomplete season.

1914–15 season
Note: W = Wins, L = Losses, T = Ties, GF= Goals For, GA = Goals Against, Pts = Points

References

Defunct ice hockey leagues in Nova Scotia
Defunct ice hockey leagues in Canada
1914 establishments in Canada
1915 disestablishments in Canada
Sports leagues established in 1914
1914–15 in Canadian ice hockey by league